The men's long jump event at the 2017 European Athletics Indoor Championships was held on 3 March 2015 at 9:40 (qualification) and 4 March, 19:32 (final) local time.

Medalists

Records

Results

Qualification 
Qualification: Qualifying performance 7.90 (Q) or at least 8 best performers (q) advance to the Final.

Final

References 

2017 European Athletics Indoor Championships
Long jump at the European Athletics Indoor Championships